Erkan Avseren (born 1 July 1971) is a Turkish former footballer and current manager who was most recently the head coach of Afyonspor.

Started his professional career at Fenerbahçe, Avseren played in varied Turkish clubs including Beşiktaş and Kayserispor. Avseren capped 5 times for Turkey between 1995 and 1996.

Honours

Club
Beşiktaş J.K.
Turkish Super Cup: 1998

References

External links

Profile at Turkish Football Federation

1971 births
Living people
Footballers from Istanbul
Association football defenders
Fenerbahçe S.K. footballers
Beşiktaş J.K. footballers
Malatyaspor footballers
Turkish footballers
Turkey international footballers
Boluspor footballers
Vanspor footballers
Siirtspor footballers
Diyarbakırspor footballers
Kayserispor footballers
Turkish football managers